Tania Pérez (born 2 June 1959) is a Cuban sports shooter. She competed in two events at the 1992 Summer Olympics.

References

1959 births
Living people
Cuban female sport shooters
Olympic shooters of Cuba
Shooters at the 1992 Summer Olympics
Place of birth missing (living people)
Pan American Games medalists in shooting
Pan American Games gold medalists for Cuba
Shooters at the 1987 Pan American Games
20th-century Cuban women